The 2015 Clásica de Almería was the 30th edition of the Clásica de Almería cycle race and was held on 15 February 2015. The race started and finished in Almería. The race was won by Mark Cavendish.

Teams
Twenty teams competed in the 2015 Clásica de Almería. These included eight UCI WorldTeams, ten UCI Professional Continental and two UCI Continental teams.

The teams that participated in the race were:

Result

References

External links

2015
2015 in road cycling
2015 in Spanish sport